The women's freestyle 48 kilograms is a competition featured at the 2007 World Wrestling Championships, and was held at the Heydar Aliyev Sports and Concert Complex in Baku, Azerbaijan on 21 September 2007.

Results
Legend
F — Won by fall

Finals

Top half

Section 1

Section 2

Bottom half

Section 3

Section 4

Repechage

 Mariya Stadnik of Azerbaijan originally finished 7th, but later the CAS decided that all results obtained by her between 26 April 2006 and 25 April 2008 must be disqualified.

References

Women's freestyle 48 kg